Hinlopenbreen ("Hinlopen glacier") is a glacier stream in Spitsbergen, Svalbard. The glacier debouches into Vaigattbogen in Hinlopen Strait.

References

Glaciers of Spitsbergen